Gornje Zaostro is a village in the Berane Municipality, in northeastern Montenegro.

Geography
The village is located ca. 10 kilometres from Berane.

History
During World War II, the village was the headquarters of Chetnik commander Pavle Đurišić. In July 2002, a monument was erected in the village in honour of its Chetnik heritage. In 2003, the Special Unit of the Interior Ministry of Montenegro entered the village and blew up the monument.

Demographics
According to the 2002 census, the village had 236 inhabitants, of which 146 (61,86%) identified as Serbs, and 57 (24,15%) identified as Montenegrins.

According to the 2011 census, its population was 187.

References

Populated places in Berane Municipality
Serb communities in Montenegro